A literary festival, also known as a book festival or writers' festival, is a regular gathering of writers and readers, typically on an annual basis in a particular city. A literary festival usually features a variety of presentations and readings by authors, as well as other events, delivered over a period of several days, with the primary objectives of promoting the authors' books and fostering a love of literature and writing.

Writers' conferences are sometimes designed to provide an intellectual and academic focus for groups of writers without the involvement of the general public.

There are many literary festivals held around the world. A non-exhaustive list is set out below, including dates when a festival is usually held (where available).

List of literary festivals

Notable literary festivals include:

Africa

 Port Harcourt Book Festival, October 20–25

Asia

Asia-Pacific

Ubud Writers and Readers Festival (UWRF), held annually at Ubud, Bali in Indonesia (www.ubudwritersfestival.com)
Gateway Litfest, February/ March
 Delhi Poetry Festival, January 
 Dehradun Literature Festival, February 
 Jashn-e-Rekhta, Urdu literary festival held annually in New Delhi 
 Guntur International Poetry Festival (GIPF), held annually since 2008 in Guntur, India 
 Adelaide Writers' Week, held annually during the Adelaide Festival of Arts in March
 Emirates Airline Festival of Literature, held annually in Dubai, United Arab Emirates
 Galle Literary Festival, January 
 George Town Literary Festival
 Hay Festival Dhaka, November 
 Hong Kong International Literary Festival, October/November 
 Islamabad Literature Festival, April
 Jakarta International Literary Festival (JILF), August 
 Jaipur Literary Festival, January, also JLF Adelaide in September/October
 Karachi Literature Festival, February 
 Kuala Lumpur International Literary Festival, July 
 Lahore Literary Festival, February 
 Lit for Life, Chennai, Delhi January/February
 Lucknow Literary Festival, Lucknow, February/ March
 Nepal Literature Festival
 Newcastle, New South Wales National Young Writers' Festival, September/October 
 Perth Writers' Festival, February/March
 Queer LitFest, Chennai (QLF), July/September 
 Shanghai International Literary Festival
 Singapore Writers Festival, October/November 1
 Sydney Writers' Festival, May 
 Williamstown Literary Festival April/May 
 Chandigarh Literati, November
 Kalinga Literary Festival (KLF), July

Middle East
 Israel's Hebrew Book Week
The Jerusalem International Writers Festival
Emirates Airline Festival of Literature

Europe

 Authors' Reading Month, Brno, Wroclaw, Kosice, Lviv, Ostrava, in July
 Berlin International Literature Festival, in September 
 Bradford Literature Festival, now held around June/July 
 Cambridge Literary Festival, held bi-annually in April and November, with many events accessible online
 Cheltenham Literature Festival, October 6–15
 Chester Literature Festival, October
 The Children's Bookshow, autumn
 Conrad Festival, Kraków, Poland, October. The largest literary festival in Central Europe.
Creative Folkestone Book Festival, 4 - 13 June, 2021 (it is normally held in November and heralds the start of the festive season).
 Cúirt International Festival of Literature, Galway, April
 Edinburgh International Book Festival, August 13–29, coinciding with the annual Edinburgh Festival
 FestivalandCo, Shakespeare-themed literary festival held in Paris, France, at the Shakespeare and Company bookstore
 Festivaletteratura, held in Mantua, Italy, at the beginning of September
 Göteborg Book Fair, Gothenburg, Sweden, Sept
 Harrogate International Festivals Theaksons Old Peculier Crime Writing Festival, home to the Theakston's Old Peculier Crime Novel of the Year, world's largest crime fiction Festival, in July
 Harrogate Raworths Harrogate Literature Festival, in July Harrogate International Festivals
 Harrogate History Festival, chaired in 2015 by Manda Scott, in October Harrogate International Festivals
 Hawkesbury Upton Literary Festival, late April
 The Hay Festival, May 27 – June 5
 The North London Literary Festival, held late March or early April 
 Istanbul Tanpınar Literature Festival, held in Istanbul, Turkey, at the beginning of May 
 Jewish Book Week, London, late February and early March
Louisiana Literature, late August, held at the Louisiana Museum of Modern Art, Humlebæk, Denmark.
 Norwegian Festival of Literature, Lillehammer, Norway, is the largest literature festival in the Scandinavian countries since 1996
 Openair Literatur Festival Zürich, Zürich, held annually since 2013
 Peak Literary Festival, October 25 – November 5 /May 25 – June 6
 Prague Writers Festival, Prague, Czech Republic, June 3–10
 Rencontres aubrac, Aveyron,  France
 Sarajevo Poetry Days, Sarajevo,  Bosnia and Herzegovina
 WALTIC, Stockholm, Sweden

North America

 Banff Mountain Book Festival, October 31 – November 2, 2007
 Boston Book Festival, annually in October
 Burlington Book Festival, September 15–17, 2006
 Children's Literature Festival at the University of Central Missouri, held annually in March since 1969
 The Curwood Festival celebrates the life and writings of James Oliver Curwood the first weekend of June in Owosso, Michigan.
 Eden Mills Writers' Festival, Eden Mills/Guelph, Ontario, Canada
 Festival of Literary Diversity, Brampton, Ontario, Canada
 The Frye Festival, Moncton, New Brunswick, April 22–28, 2013. Honouring Northrop Frye. International cast.
 Guadalajara International Book Fair, November 27 – December 5, 2010
 Hollywood Book Festival, July 28, 2007
 Litquake, since 2002, San Francisco, annually in October
 Los Angeles Times Festival of Books, Los Angeles, California, penultimate weekend of April
 Miami Book Fair International, Downtown Miami, Florida, November
 National Book Festival, produced by the Library of Congress, September www.loc.gov
 Tennessee Williams/ New Orleans Literary Festival, New Orleans, annually in March.
 Texas Book Festival, Austin, Texas held annually in the fall since 1996
 Toronto International Festival of Authors, held annually in late October and early November since 1980.
 Tucson Festival of Books, Tucson, Arizona, held annually in March
 Winnipeg International Writers Festival, annually in September
 Kentucky Women Writers Conference, The, Lexington, Kentucky, September 11–13, 2008
 The Word on the Street, several cities in Canada
 Wordfest, Calgary, Alberta, held annually in October

Caribbean
 Bocas Lit Fest, Trinidad and Tobago, annually, last weekend of April
 Calabash International Literary Festival, Treasure Beach, Jamaica, biennially on even years in June

South America

Festa Literária Internacional de Paraty Is held in Paraty, city located in Brazil.
International Poetry Festival of Medellín is held in Medellín, city located in Colombia.
International Poetry Festival of Rosario is held in Rosario, city located in Argentina.
Trujillo Book Festival, is held in Trujillo city located in Peru. In the year 2012 was on March from days 1 to 12.

References

Further reading 
 Driscoll, Beth. "Sentiment analysis and the literary festival audience." Continuum 29.6 (2015): 861-873.
 Driscoll, Beth, and Claire Squires. "Serious fun: Gaming the book festival." Mémoires du livre/Studies in Book Culture 9.2 (2018).
 Johanson, Katya, and Robin Freeman. "The reader as audience: The appeal of the writers' festival to the contemporary audience." Continuum 26.2 (2012): 303-314.
 Ommundsen, Wenche. "Literary festivals and cultural consumption." Australian Literary Studies 24.1 (2009): 19.
 Robertson, Martin, and Ian Yeoman. "Signals and signposts of the future: Literary festival consumption in 2050." Tourism Recreation Research 39.3 (2014): 321-342.
 Murray, Simone. The adaptation industry: The cultural economy of contemporary literary adaptation. Routledge, 2012.
 Stewart, Cori. "The Rise and Rise of Writers’ Festivals." A Companion to Creative Writing (2013): 263-277.
 Weber, Millicent. "Conceptualizing audience experience at the literary festival." Continuum 29.1 (2015): 84-96.
 Weber, Millicent. Literary Festivals and Contemporary Book Culture. 2018.

External links